The 2015 South Gloucestershire Council election took place on 7 May 2015 to elect members of South Gloucestershire Council in England as part of nationwide  local elections.

For the first time since the creation of South Gloucestershire, the Conservatives took an overall majority with 40 of the 70 seats. This was the second one-party majority in the history of South Gloucestershire, after the Lib Dems' 1999-2003 control.

Election result

Ward results

References

2015 English local elections
May 2015 events in the United Kingdom
2015
2010s in the South Gloucestershire District